A list of films produced in Japan ordered by year in the 2010s. For an A-Z of films see :Category:Japanese films.

2010
List of Japanese films of 2010

2011
List of Japanese films of 2011

2012
List of Japanese films of 2012

2013
List of Japanese films of 2013

2014
List of Japanese films of 2014

2015
List of Japanese films of 2015

2016
List of Japanese films of 2016

2017
List of Japanese films of 2017

2018
List of Japanese films of 2018

2019
List of Japanese films of 2019

External links
 Japanese film at the Internet Movie Database

2010s
Japanese
Films